Petr Vlček (born 18 October 1973) is a Czech former professional football defender. At club level, he played within his country for Viktoria Plzeň and Slavia Prague, as well as abroad in Belgium, Greece and Cyprus. Internationally he represented the Czech Republic, making a total of 18 appearances for his nation between 1997 and 2002. He was part of the Czech squad at the 2000 UEFA European Championship. He also represented his country at the 1997 FIFA Confederations Cup.

Club career
Vlček was born in Mariánské Lázně. A defender, he played youth football for Lokomotiva Mariánské Lázně and Škoda Plzeň. He then played for Sokol Svéradice and VTJ Karlovy Vary until returning to his former team Škoda Plzeň, then FC Viktoria Plzeň, where he played for four more seasons. During the 1996–97 season, Vlček transferred to Slavia Prague, where he would spend a further four seasons.
He left his country in 2000 to play for a year in Belgium for Standard Liège and one year later he signed for Panionios for four years. For the 2005–06 season he went to Cyprus to play for Ethnikos Achna. In January 2006, Vlček signed an 18-month contract with former club Plzeň, with manager Zdeněk Michálek choosing to use him as a defensive midfielder.

He returned to Greece to play for Niki Volos in the 2006–07 season, before finishing his professional career. In 2007, he was transferred to the German fourth-level-club 1. FC Bad Kötzting.

International career
Vlček represented his country at under-21 level before making his debut in 1997 for the senior side. He was part of the Czech squad at the 2000 UEFA European Championship, but did not play in the tournament.

Personal life
Vlček went to school in Plzeň. He has two sons, Matyáš and Dominik, with his second wife, Lucie.

References

External links
 
 
 

Living people
1973 births
People from Mariánské Lázně
Association football defenders
Czech footballers
Czech Republic under-21 international footballers
Czech Republic international footballers
Czech expatriate footballers
1997 FIFA Confederations Cup players
UEFA Euro 2000 players
FC Viktoria Plzeň players
SK Slavia Prague players
Standard Liège players
Panionios F.C. players
Ethnikos Achna FC players
Belgian Pro League players
Czech First League players
Super League Greece players
Cypriot First Division players
Expatriate footballers in Belgium
Expatriate footballers in Greece
Expatriate footballers in Cyprus
Sportspeople from the Karlovy Vary Region